The 2019–20 First Women's Basketball League of Serbia is the 14th season of the First Women's Basketball League of Serbia, the highest professional basketball league in Serbia. Also, it's the 76th national championship played by Serbian clubs inclusive of the nation's previous incarnations as Yugoslavia and Serbia & Montenegro.

On 16 March 2020, the Basketball Federation of Serbia temporarily suspended its competitions due to the COVID-19 pandemic. On 2 June, the Federation canceled definitely the season due to the COVID-19 pandemic.

Teams

Promotion and relegation
Teams promoted from the Second League
Radnički Kragujevac
Proleter Zrenjanin
Teams relegated to the Second League
Spartak Subotica
Bor
Šabac
Loznica

Venues and locations

Regular season

Standings

See also
 2019–20 Milan Ciga Vasojević Cup
 2019–20 Basketball League of Serbia
 2019–20 WABA League

References

External links
 Official website
 League Standings at eurobasket.com
 League Standings at srbijasport.net

First Women's Basketball League of Serbia seasons
Serbia
Basketball
Serbia W